Pasimachus viridans is a species of ground beetle in the family Carabidae. It is found in Central America and North America.

Subspecies
These two subspecies belong to the species Pasimachus viridans:
 Pasimachus viridans ambiens Casey
 Pasimachus viridans viridans

References

Further reading

 

Scaritinae
Articles created by Qbugbot
Beetles described in 1858